2011 World Championships may refer to:
 Alpine skiing: 
Alpine World Ski Championships 2011
2011 IPC Alpine Skiing World Championships
 Aquatics: 2011 World Aquatics Championships
 Athletics: 2011 World Championships in Athletics
Cross-country running: 2011 IAAF World Cross Country Championships
 Athletics: 2011 IPC Athletics World Championships
 Badminton: 2011 BWF World Championships
 Boxing: 2011 World Amateur Boxing Championships
 Curling: 
2011 Ford World Men's Curling Championship
2011 Capital One World Women's Curling Championship
2011 World Mixed Doubles Curling Championship
 Darts: 2011 BDO World Darts Championship
 Darts: 2011 PDC World Darts Championship
 Fencing: 2011 World Fencing Championships
 Figure skating: 2011 World Figure Skating Championships
 Gymnastics
 Artistic Gymnastics 2011 World Artistic Gymnastics Championships
 Rhythmic Gymnastics 2011 World Rhythmic Gymnastics Championships
 Freestyle skiing: FIS Freestyle World Ski Championships 2011
 Handball:
 2011 World Men's Handball Championship
 2011 World Women's Handball Championship
 Ice hockey: 2011 Men's World Ice Hockey Championships
 Ice hockey: 2011 Women's World Ice Hockey Championships
 Netball: 2011 World Netball Championships
 Nordic skiing: FIS Nordic World Ski Championships 2011
 Speed skating
Allround: 2011 World Allround Speed Skating Championships
Sprint: 2011 World Sprint Speed Skating Championships
Single distances: 2011 World Single Distance Speed Skating Championships
 Snooker: 2011 World Snooker Championship
 Table tennis: 2011 World Table Tennis Championships

See also
 2011 World Cup (disambiguation)